Dyula may refer to:

 Dyula people
 Dyula language

Language and nationality disambiguation pages